Laia Pons (born 24 April 1993) is a Spanish competitor in synchronized swimming. She won a bronze medal in team competition at the 2012 Summer Olympics.

References 

Living people
Olympic bronze medalists for Spain
Spanish synchronized swimmers
Olympic synchronized swimmers of Spain
Synchronized swimmers at the 2012 Summer Olympics
1993 births
Olympic medalists in synchronized swimming
Medalists at the 2012 Summer Olympics
World Aquatics Championships medalists in synchronised swimming
Synchronized swimmers at the 2013 World Aquatics Championships